Rush Township is one of the sixteen townships of Scioto County, Ohio, United States.  The 2010 census counted 3,171 people in the township.

Geography
Located in the center of the county, it borders the following townships:
Morgan Township - north
Valley Township - northeast
Clay Township - southeast
Washington Township - south
Union Township - west

No municipalities are located in Rush Township, although the unincorporated community of McDermott lies in the township's west.

Name and history
It is named for Dr. Benjamin Rush, an early physician and Founding Father of the United States.  Statewide, other Rush Townships are located in Champaign and Tuscarawas counties.

Rush Township was organized June 3, 1867 by Levi Kirkendall.  Its earliest settlers date to 1796.

Government
The township is governed by a three-member board of trustees, who are elected in November of odd-numbered years to a four-year term beginning on the following January 1. Two are elected in the year after the presidential election and one is elected in the year before it. There is also an elected township fiscal officer, who serves a four-year term beginning on April 1 of the year after the election, which is held in November of the year before the presidential election. Vacancies in the fiscal officership or on the board of trustees are filled by the remaining trustees.

References

External links
County website

Townships in Scioto County, Ohio
Townships in Ohio